The 2001 Cumberland vs. Jacksonville State football game was a college football game between the  and the Jacksonville State Gamecocks played on August 30, 2001.  The game was played at Burgess-Snow Stadium in Jacksonville, Alabama.  Jacksonville State won the game by a score of 72 to 10.  During the game, Ashley Martin became the first woman to play and score in an NCAA football game and the second woman to play and score in a college game in any division.

Game play
Jacksonville State led the game beginning with Lorenzo Banks receiving a 33-yard pass from Reggie Stancil for a touchdown.  Steven Lee kicked the first extra point to put the score 7–0.  Martin would kick two more extra points in the first quarter alone and the first quarter ended with a score of 21–3.  Jacksonville led the remainder of the game.

The game ended in a final score of Jacksonville State 72, Cumberland 10.

Aftermath

Prior to this game, female athletes at Duke and Louisville had come close to playing in a game but did not.  In 1997, Liz Heaston became the first female athlete to score in a college football game.  In 2003, Katie Hnida became the first female athlete to score in a Division I-A bowl game.

Martin's success as a female athlete is considered a major milestone since the 1972 Title IX amendment of the Civil Rights Act of 1964 in the United States.

See also
 List of historically significant college football games
 Women's American football

References

2001 NCAA Division I-AA football season
2001 NAIA football season
vs. Jacksonville 2001
vs. Cumberland 2001
August 2001 sports events in the United States
2001 in sports in Alabama